Graeme Malcolm Wood (born 6 November 1956) is a former Australian cricketer who played in 59 Test matches and 83 One Day Internationals from 1978 to 1989. He scored nine Test centuries in his career, which was a record for a Western Australian until it was surpassed by Justin Langer.

International career
His Test debut came against India as a 21-year-old in 1978. He got his place in the side due to several of Australia's best players defecting to World Series Cricket. Later in the year he toured the West Indies and scored a century in the 1st Test as well as four half-centuries as he finished the Test series with the best run aggregate of 474 runs at 47.40.

He maintained his place in the Australian cricket team for the majority of the early to mid-1980s. He was dropped after the disastrous Ashes tour of England in 1985. After excellent domestic form Wood was recalled in 1988/89 for the Test series against the West Indies. Wood scored 111 and 42 in the second Test, but was dropped after the third Test. Overall his best innings seemed to be against the West Indies, and the Australian selectors always seemed to recall him when a series against them was close. But after 1988 he never appeared in the Test side again.

In first-class cricket, Wood scored 13,353 runs, making 35 centuries and 61 half centuries. As the captain of Western Australia he led the team to victory in three Sheffield Shield finals and another in the limited overs competition.

Other sports
Prior to making his Test debut in 1978, Wood played Australian rules football for the East Fremantle Football Club in the West Australian National Football League, playing 14 games between 1975 and 1977.

Administration
Wood held various management positions in Carlton & United Breweries and Treasury Wine Estates after his international career in cricket.

References

External links

1956 births
Living people
Australia One Day International cricketers
Australia Test cricketers
Western Australia cricketers
East Fremantle Football Club players
Australian rules footballers from Fremantle
Sportsmen from Western Australia
Cricketers from Fremantle
Cricketers at the 1983 Cricket World Cup